Wing-It Productions, is a 501(c)(3) non-profit theater company based in Seattle, Washington, United States which exclusively produces improvised theater. Wing-It operates from their theater located at 55th Avenue and University Way NE in Seattle's U-District. The organization is primarily known as its main brand, Jet City Improv.

Summary of performance programming 
Jet City primarily produces three shows, Jet City Improv, Twisted Flicks, and the Jet City Presents Series. Jet City Improv is shortform improv show performed three times a week, Fridays at 10:30pm, and Saturdays at 8:00pm and 10:30pm. Performances are roughly 90 minutes with an intermission.

Twisted Flicks a B-movie which is played with the sound turned off. Improvisers with microphones create the dialogue and sound effects based on suggestions from the audience. Twisted Flicks features an improvising musician, who writes and performs a parody song to kick off the movie, then underscores the remainder of the film.

Jet City Presents is a rotating improvised longform show, performed Thursdays and Fridays at 8:00pm.

History

Early days of Jet City Improv 
Jet City Improv was founded in 1992 by Mike Christensen and Andrew McMasters and debuted with a free show on March 18, 1992, at the Second Story Studios (89 Yesler Way, Seattle, WA). In July 1993 Jet City Improv began performing every Friday at 11 pm at the Northwest Actors Studio, until the following October when the show moved to the Belltown Theater Center where they performed Fridays and Saturdays at 10:30pm. The 10:30pm Friday/Saturday night performance became a tradition that Jet City maintains to this day.

Creation of Wing-It /Jet City and its subsequent significant dates 
In December 1994 Christensen and McMasters founded Wing-It Productions (a 501c3 Non-profit organization) to take on the production of Jet City Improv's activities. Jet City Improv's performances were relocated to the Ethnic Cultural Theater, on the University of Washington campus in 1997. In October 1997, Jet City debuted the first Twisted Flick, an improvised re-dubbing of Creature from the Black Lagoon. Jet City produced the first ever Jet City Improv New Year's Eve show on December 31, 1999, entitled the "Y2K Bash" . In June 2000 Twisted Flicks began performing for the Fremont Outdoor Movies. The following January (2001) Jet City Improv moved performances to the University Heights Center for approximately one year. Twisted Flicks moved into the Paradox Theater in September 2001.

The Lost Folio, Jet City's first longform, premiered in April 2002. In February 2003 Jet City Improv took over the lease to the former Paradox Theater, thus bringing all performances into one venue. It was renamed the Historic University Theater. In February 2003 Jet City Improv co-produced the first annual Seattle Festival of Improv Theater (SFIT); a national festival of improvisational theater.

Education programming 

Jet City offers a variety of Adult Continuing Education courses including Improv 101, 102, 103, 201, 202, as well as the Performance Series and a Drop-In Dojo. Classes are held every quarter of the year, and run for eight to twelve week sessions. Drop-In Dojo is held every Monday from 6-8:00pm and is open to anyone.

Jet City also offers classes and residencies for high, middle, and elementary school students. 
Jet City is a leader in corporate workshops focusing on teamwork, creativity and communication.

Outreach programming 

Jet City began an outreach program in early 1998 providing free performances for events, children's camps and fundraisers. This program performs annual performances for the NW Burn Foundation, American Cancer Society and other kids camps. The program was expanded in 2001 to provide free workshops for at risk and incarcerated youth in the Seattle Area. Weekly classes are taught at the Seattle Juvenile Detention facility and the Sanctuary Arts Center.

References

Evening Magazine. "The Best of Western Washington 2013". www.best.king5.com. Retrieved 8 November 2013.

External links 
 Wing-It Productions' Web site
 Jet City Improv's Web site
 Web site for Seattle Festival of Improv Theater

Non-profit organizations based in Seattle
501(c)(3) organizations